The 2013–14 Cypriot Fourth Division was the 29th season of the Cypriot fourth-level football league. Enosi Neon Ypsona won their 1st title.

Format
Fifteen teams participated in the 2013–14 Cypriot Fourth Division. All teams played against each other twice, once at their home and once away. The team with the most points at the end of the season crowned champions. The first two teams were promoted to the 2014–15 Cypriot Third Division and the last two teams were relegated to regional leagues.

Point system
Teams received three points for a win, one point for a draw and zero points for a loss.

Changes from previous season
Teams promoted to 2013–14 Cypriot Third Division
 MEAP Nisou
 Finikas Ayias Marinas Chrysochous
 THOI Lakatamia
 Konstantios & Evripidis Trachoniou

Teams relegated from 2012–13 Cypriot Third Division
 Frenaros FC 
 Atromitos Yeroskipou 1

1Atromitos Yeroskipou withdrew from the 2013–14 Cypriot Fourth Division.

Teams promoted from regional leagues
 Digenis Akritas Ypsona
 Enosis Kokkinotrimithia
 Lenas Limassol
 Olympias Lympion
 Omonia Oroklinis
 OXEN Peristeronas

Teams relegated to regional leagues
 AEN Ayiou Georgiou Vrysoullon-Acheritou
 Dynamo Pervolion

Stadia and locations

League standings

Results

See also
 Cypriot Fourth Division
 2013–14 Cypriot First Division
 2013–14 Cypriot Cup for lower divisions
 Cypriot football league system

Sources
 

Cypriot Fourth Division seasons
Cyprus
2013–14 in Cypriot football